Try and Get It is a 1924 American silent comedy film directed by Cullen Tate and starring Bryant Washburn, Billie Dove, and Edward Everett Horton.

Plot
As described in a film magazine review, Larry Donovan, owner of a printing business, tells his credit manager Joe  Merrill that if he cannot collect a seven-year-old bill for $25.11 against Tim Perrin in a week, he is through. Donovan also tells Glenn Collins that if he does not get Perrin's account within a week, he is through, too. Both young men are thrown out of Perrin's cement yard. Joe goes to a modiste shop owned by Perrin, ready to park there until he receives payment. He makes various attempts to see Perrin, who finally beats him up and wrecks the shop. When Merrill wins the love of Perrin's daughter and, with her connivance, finally secures the payment of the bill, Perrin capitulates and offers him a job.

Cast

Preservation
A print of Try and Get It is held in the Library of Congress collection.

References

Bibliography
 Monaco, James. The Encyclopedia of Film. Perigee Books, 1991.

External links

1924 films
1924 comedy films
1920s English-language films
American silent feature films
Silent American comedy films
American black-and-white films
Films directed by Cullen Tate
Producers Distributing Corporation films
1920s American films